6 Underground may refer to:

6 Underground (film), a 2019 film directed by Michael Bay
"6 Underground" (song), by Sneaker Pimps, 1996
6underground, a music venue in Manila, Philippines